Testosterone palmitate,  also known as testosterone hexadecanoate, testosterone 17β-palmitate, and androst-4-en-17β-ol-3-one 17β-palmitate, is an anabolic-androgenic steroid (AAS) and an androgen ester – specifically, the C17β palmitate (hexadecanoate) ester of testosterone – which was never marketed. It is a prodrug of testosterone and, when administered via intramuscular injection, is associated with a long-lasting depot effect and extended duration of action.

Testosterone palmitate is a longer-chain ester of testosterone compared to testosterone undecanoate. Relative to testosterone undecanoate, testosterone palmitate shows higher oral bioavailability. However, no free testosterone was observed after administration of testosterone palmitate, suggesting that it is not hydrolyzed as efficiently as testosterone undecanoate. On the other hand, another study found that testosterone palmitate was hydrolyzed in humans.

See also
 Testosterone stearate

References

Abandoned drugs
Androgens and anabolic steroids
Androstanes
Ketones
Palmitate esters
Prodrugs
Testosterone esters